Me siento tan sola (Spanish, "I feel so lonely") was the third album from Mexican singer Gloria Trevi, and was originally released the 23 of july of 1992 by BMG Ariola. A limited release a month after, "I feel so alone", in the convention of her record company (BMG Ariola), was awarded a Double Gold Record for high sales of her album. Trevi promoted this material in countries such as Argentina, Chile, the United States, Venezuela, Colombia, Puerto Rico and Central America. It was very popular in Japan where it sold about 100,000 copies and in 1992 first traveled to Spain  and certified gold record where she also managed to hit the difficult Spanish audience with her uncommon spectacle.

In 1993, the singer was chosen by the Chilean press as Queen of the Song Festival of Viña del Mar where she appeared before 20,000 spectators. Also, Gloria was presented with great success at the Paramount Theatre at Madison Square Garden in New York. She also had many successful concerts in Washington, California, El Paso, Dallas and many places of the American Union that she became the pop rock Mexican musician that has given more concerts in the United States. That year was one of the longest concert tours in her career, as she performed in various venues such as Universal Studios Amphitheatre in Atlanta, Georgia; San Antonio, Texas; Sacramento, California; Chicago, Illinois and for the first time in the Riviera Hotel in Las Vegas, Nevada. During the month of September, Gloria Trevi was confirmed as the most important Mexican rock pop singer of the moment, and proclaimed as the Mexican Madonna by the New York Newspaper and The Wall Street Journal. Album topped many Latin-American charts. The album peaked at number eight on the Latin Pop Albums chart in the United States.

Track listing

Singles
Zapatos Viejos #1 in Mexican charts
Con Los Ojos Cerrados #1 in Mexican charts
Me Siento Tan Sola #10 in Mexican charts
Los Borregos #3 in Mexican charts
La Acera De Enfrente #2 in Mexican charts

References

Gloria Trevi albums
1992 albums
Spanish-language albums